Audi e-tron Quattro may refer to:

 Audi R18 e-tron Quattro, prototype-class racer, see Audi R18
 Audi e-tron Quattro concept car, see Audi e-tron (brand)
 Audi e-tron Quattro production car, see Audi e-tron (2018)

See also
 Audi Quattro
 Audi e-tron (brand)
 Audi
 Quattro (disambiguation)